The  was signed on 26 August 1858 by Lord Elgin and the then representatives of the Japanese government (the Tokugawa shogunate), and was ratified between Queen Victoria and the Tycoon of Japan at Yedo on 11 July 1859. 

The concessions which Japan made in the treaty were threefold:

A representative of the British government would be permitted to reside at Edo.
Hakodate, Kanagawa and Nagasaki were to be opened to British commerce on 1 July 1859 and British subjects could travel within a range of 25 miles of each port. Hyogo would open on 1 January 1863.
British subjects would be allowed to reside in Edo from 1 January 1862 and Osaka from 1 January 1863.

About this ratification
This ratification seems to have meant that Queen Victoria would have power and jurisdiction in the dominions of the Tycoon of Japan.

The London Gazette published on 4 March 1859 says, "a Treaty of Peace, Friendship, and Commerce hath been agreed upon and concluded between Her Majesty and His Majesty the Tycoon of Japan, which was signed by the respective Plenipotentiaries of their said Majesties on the twenty-sixth day of August last: And whereas immediately upon and from the exchange of the ratifications of the said Treaty, Her Majesty will have power and jurisdiction in the dominions of the Tycoon of Japan ".

See also
 Anglo-Japanese Alliance
 Ansei Treaties
 Japan-United Kingdom relations
 Harris Treaty
 Lord Elgin

Notes

References
 Auslin, Michael R. (2004).   Negotiating with Imperialism: The Unequal Treaties and the Culture of Japanese Diplomacy. Cambridge: Harvard University Press. ;  OCLC 56493769

Japan–United Kingdom treaties
Treaties of the United Kingdom (1801–1922)
1858 in the United Kingdom
1858 in Japan
Unequal treaties
1858 treaties
Treaties of the Tokugawa shogunate
August 1858 events